Píñar is a municipality located in the province of Granada, Spain. It is located at 46 km from Granada, and 11 km from Iznalloz, capital of the Comarca of Los Montes Orientales.

It is home to the ruins of a large castle (likely founded by the Romans, and later re-used by the Moors), declared national monument, and to the Cuevas de las Ventanas, a group of  caves. The Carigüela archaeological site is also located within the communal territory.

His sister city is Tetuán, Morocco.

References

Municipalities in the Province of Granada